Aharon Shabtai (born April 11, 1939) is an Israeli poet and  translator.

Biography
Aharon Shabtai studied Greek and philosophy in Jerusalem, at the Sorbonne and at Cambridge, and he teaches literature in Tel Aviv University. He has published some 20 books of poetry in Hebrew, and English translations of his work have appeared in the American Poetry Review, the London Review of Books, and Parnassus: Poetry in Review.

His poetic style has varied over the years, from minimalist and romantic ("The Domestic Poem"), to erotic ("Ziva") and  fiercely political ("Sun Sun").

He is the younger brother of Yaakov Shabtai, author of the novel Past Continuous, and was married to the linguist and political activist Professor Tanya Reinhart until her death in 2007. He is also the uncle of Hamutal Shabtai, who is a psychiatrist and a novelist.

Awards and recognition
In 1993, Shabtai received the Israeli Prime Minister's Prize For his translations. 
In 1999, Shabtai was awarded the Tchernichovsky Prize for exemplary translation.

Books

In Hebrew
 Shemesh Shemesh (Sun Sun), Hargol, 2006
 Artzenu (Our Land), Ha-kibbutz ha-meuchad, 2002
 Politiqa (Politics), Even Hoshen, 1999
 Be-xodesh May ha-nifla’ (In the Wonderful Month of May), Siman Qri’a/ Ha-kibbutz ha-meuchad, 1997
 Ha-lev (The Heart), Siman Qri’a/ Ha-kibbutz ha-meuchad, 1995
 Metaziviqa (Metazivika), Zmora Bitan, 1992
 Ziva (Ziva), Zmora Bitan, 1990
 Gerushin (Divorce), Mosad Bialik, 1990
 Ahava (Love), ‛Am ‛Oved, 1988
 Begin (Begin), Keter, 1986
 Ha-hartza’a ha-rishona (The First Lecture), ‛Akhshav, 1985
 Sefer ha-klum (The Book of Nothing), Sifriyat Po‛alim, 1982
 Ha-xamor (The Donkey), ‛Eqed, 1982
 Xut (Thread), Proza, 1981
 Xara’, mavet (Shit, Death), ‛Akhshav, 1979
 Ha-po’ema ha-beytit (The Domestic Poem), Siman Qri’a, 1976
 Qibbutz (Kibbutz), Ha-kibbutz ha-meuchad, 1973
 Xadar ha-morim (Teachers’ Room), ‛Akhshav, 1966

In French
Le Poème Domestique, Editions de l’Éclat (Paris), 1987
La Première Lecture, Editions de l’Éclat (Paris), 1990

In English
Love and Other Poems, The Sheep Meadow Press (New York), 1997
J’accuse, New Directions (New York), 2003

See also
Hebrew literature

References

External links
https://web.archive.org/web/20110720150041/http://israel.poetryinternationalweb.org/piw_cms/cms/cms_module/index.php?obj_id=3158
http://www.pbs.org/newshour/indepth_coverage/entertainment/poetry/profiles/poet_shabtai.html
http://www.poetryfoundation.org/bio/aharon-shabtai

Israeli male poets
University of Paris alumni
Academic staff of Tel Aviv University
1939 births
Living people
Alumni of the University of Cambridge
20th-century Israeli male writers
21st-century Israeli male writers